Ivanhoe, the Norman Swordsman is a 1971 Capa e spada film directed by Roberto Mauri.

Plot
After the death of King Henry I in 12th-century England, the throne is taken by Stephen Cunningham who claims to possess the mythical "Sword of Normandy." A man named Ivanhoe returns from years in the Holy Land knowing that Henry I's son, the rightful heir to the throne, died in the Crusades, and that Cunningham's sword is a fake. After forging alliances with a group of highwaymen and a band of traveling thespians, Ivanhoe reclaims the real sword that will topple Cunningham.

Cast
 Mark Damon as Ivanhoe
 Luis Dávila as Stephen of Cunningham
 Krista Nell as Brenda
  Aveline Frederica as Kitty 
 Vassili Karis as Trigui 
 Alan Collins (aka Luciano Pigozzi) as  Mortimer, the Principa 
 Linda Sini as Wife of Mortimer 
 Aldo Berti as Art
Spartaco Conversi as Kitts 
 Nello Pazzafini 	as Ghippo

Production
Ivanhoe, the Norman Swordsman was shot in Barcelona Spain at Cardona's Castle and Cardona's Collegiate Church

Release
Ivanhoe, the Norman Swordsman was released on April 29, 1971.

See also 
 List of Italian films of 1971

References

Footnotes

Sources

External links

Ivanhoe, the Norman Swordsman at Variety Distribution

Italian historical films
Films set in the 12th century
Films set in England
1970s adventure films
Italian adventure films
1971 films
Films directed by Roberto Mauri
Films based on Ivanhoe
1970s Italian films